The Auxiliary Patrol was an antisubmarine patrols initiative by the British to help combat German submarine operations in the early stages of World War I. It was under the command of the Admiral of Patrols at the Admiralty and was the pioneer of anti-submarine warfare.

History
On May 1, 1912 the post of Admiral of Patrols was established responsible for five destroyer flotilla's covering waters around the British Isles. In 1914, the Board of Admiralty sent an order the Admiralty War Staff to re-evaluate the functional role the patrol flotillas off the Eastern Coast of Britain the First Sea Lord indicated that the current function of patrolling would now be that of coastal defence.  After the implementation took place R Admiral de Robeck was then replaced as (ADMOP) by a new commander Commodore George A. Ballard.  He assumed the duties of Admiral of Patrols on the 1 May 1914  the auxiliary patrol was then a component part of the Admiral of Patrols command until 1917.

The majority of British trawlers were commandeered by the Admiralty, and those left were obliged to fish in groups of 20 with additional protection.

The Auxiliary Patrol was crewed by fishermen and led mainly by Merchant Navy men commissioned into the Royal Naval Reserve. They operated as trawlers do, in all weathers. Their trawlers were retrofitted with armaments, typically 3,6 or 12-pounder guns as well as 7.5" Bomb Throwers (Anti Submarine howitzers). Specialist crew such as signallers and gunners were also put on board.

Later in the war the Admiralty built 3 classes of larger trawlers as well as developing a new special class of Minesweeper.

By the Second World War, the Royal Navy had formed a specialist minesweeping capability, and the Royal Naval Patrol Service was formed, known to many as "Harry Tate's Navy".

Patrol areas Home waters
In 1914 new patrol areas were designated "Auxiliary" that covered UK waters.

Areas allocated by number

 Auxiliary Patrol Areas I—Stornoway 
 Auxiliary Patrol Areas II—Shetlands
 Auxiliary Patrol Areas III—Orkneys 
 Auxiliary Patrol Area IV—Cromarty, Moray Firth 
 Auxiliary Patrol, Area V—Peterhead
 Auxiliary Patrol Area VI—Granton 	
 Auxiliary Patrol Area VII—Granton 
 Auxiliary Patrol Area VIII—Tyne 
 Auxiliary Patrol Area IX—Humber 
 Auxiliary Patrol Area X—Yarmouth, Harwich local area, Nore local area 
 Auxiliary Patrol Area XI—Dover and the Downs
 Auxiliary Patrol Area XII—Portsmouth 
 Auxiliary Patrol Area XIII—Portland 
 Auxiliary Patrol Area XIV—Plymouth, Falmouth, Bristol Channel area 
 Auxiliary Patrol Area XV—Milford Haven 
 Auxiliary Patrol Area XVI—Kingston, Liverpool local area 
 Auxiliary Patrol Area XVII—Lough Lame, Clyde local area–(North Coast of Ireland) 
 Auxiliary Patrol Area XVIII—Lough Swilly 
 Auxiliary Patrol Area XIX—Killybegs 
 Auxiliary Patrol Area XX—Galway Bay 
 Auxiliary Patrol Area XXI—Queenstown 
 Auxiliary Patrol Area XXII—Holyhead  
 Auxiliary Patrol Area XXIII–(?)

Areas allocated by name
 Nore Auxiliary Patrol Area–(covering east of London and the mouth of the Nore)
 Harwich Auxiliary Patrol Area–(covering north of the Nore and off the coast of Harwich) 
 Bristol Auxiliary Patrol Area–(covering the Bristol Channel)
 Mersey Auxiliary Patrol Area–(covering off mouth of the river Mersey)
 Clyde Auxiliary Patrol Area–(covering the mouth of the river Clyde)

Patrol areas Mediterranean Sea
The Mediterranean Sea was divided into patrol zones dividing responsibility between the British, French and Italian navies.

British areas
 Auxiliary Patrol Area 1 (Mediterranean west)
 Auxiliary Patrol Area 5 (Mediterranean central)
 Auxiliary Patrol Area 8 (Aegean sea)
 Auxiliary Patrol Area 10 (East Mediterranean south of Crete, to the coast of Egypt)

French areas
 Auxiliary Patrol Area 4 (Tunisia, eastern coast)
 Auxiliary Patrol Area 7 (Greece, Southwest)
 Auxiliary Patrol Area 9 (East Mediterranean)

Italian Areas
 Auxiliary Patrol Area 3, (Tyrrhenian Sea)
 Auxiliary Patrol Area 6, (Adriatic sea)
 Auxiliary Patrol Area 11, (Gulf of Sidra)

Sources
 Harley Simon, Lovell Tony, (2017), Admiral of Patrols, dreadnoughtproject.org, http://www.dreadnoughtproject.org.

See also
 Dover Patrol
 Northern Patrol
 Royal Naval Patrol Service
 Trawlers of the Royal Navy

References

External links
Royal Naval Patrol Service Association
Harry Tate's Navy

Royal Navy patrols
Units and formations of the Royal Navy in World War I